David Edgar Morgan (17 May 1896 – )) was a Welsh dual-code international rugby union, and professional rugby league footballer who played in the 1910s and 1920s.

Playing career

Rugby union career
Morgan joined first class Welsh team, Llanelli RFC, from New Dock Stars RFC. From Llanelli, Morgan was first selected to represent the Wales national team in 1920, a home game at the Cardiff Arms Park against Ireland, as part of the 1920 Five Nations Championship. Wales won the game, the last of the campaign, by a large margin. The following season Morgan was reselected for the 1921 Championship, and played in the first three games; losses to England and Scotland, and his last union international appearance a win over France.

During the mid-season break, Morgan was elected to become Llanelli's captain for the forthcoming 1921/22 season. He was unable to accept the role as during the same period he signed professional papers to join rugby league team Hull, the position going to his vice-captain Albert Jenkins. As Morgan was one of several players to switch to league during the period, he was interviewed by the Welsh Rugby Union to discover the reason for his move to professional rugby. Morgan responded that it was purely financial as he had been out of work for several months. Morgan was captain of Hull during the 1923–24 season.

International honours
Morgan won caps for Great Britain while at Hull in 1921 against Australia (2 matches).

Challenge Cup Final appearances
Morgan played left-, i.e. number 11, in Hull FC's 9–10 defeat by Rochdale Hornets in the 1922  Challenge Cup final during the 1921–22 season at Headingley Rugby Stadium, Leeds, in front of a crowd of 34,827.

Bibliography

References

External links
!Great Britain Statistics at englandrl.co.uk (statistics currently missing due to not having appeared for both Great Britain, and England)
(archived by web.archive.org) Stats → PastPlayers → M at hullfc.com
(archived by web.archive.org) Statistics at hullfc.com

1896 births
1983 deaths
Dual-code rugby internationals
Great Britain national rugby league team players
Hull F.C. players
Llanelli RFC players
New Dock Stars RFC players
Rugby league players from Llanelli
Rugby league second-rows
Rugby union forwards
Wales international rugby union players
Wales national rugby league team players
Welsh rugby league players
Welsh rugby union players
Rugby union players from Llanelli